Kondelan (also Romanized as Kondelān; also known as Kondūlān and Ondelān) is a village in Baraan-e Shomali Rural District, in the Central District of Isfahan County, Isfahan Province, Iran. At the 2006 census, its population was 881, in 231 families.

References 

Populated places in Isfahan County